Novoromashkin is a rural locality (a khutor) in Novoaksayskoye Rural Settlement, Oktyabrsky District, Volgograd Oblast, Russia. The population was 16 as of 2010. There are 3 streets.

Geography 
Novoromashkin is located on the north bank of the Tsimlyansk Reservoir, 93 km northwest of Oktyabrsky (the district's administrative centre) by road. Pugachyovskaya is the nearest rural locality.

References 

Rural localities in Oktyabrsky District, Volgograd Oblast